Bo Brundin (25 April 1937 – 4 September 2022) was a Swedish actor. He has appeared in 43 films between 1970 and 2002, and appeared in hit television miniseries such as Rich Man, Poor Man, The Rhinemann Exchange, The Word and Centennial. Most of Brundin's characters in films have been foreign—German, Dutch, Russian—but seldom Swedish. He starred in the 1970 film A Baltic Tragedy, which was entered into the 20th Berlin International Film Festival. Brundin died on 4 September 2022, at the age of 85, in Uppsala, Sweden.

Selected filmography

 A Baltic Tragedy (1970) - Eichfuss
 The Headless Eyes (1971) - Arthur Malcolm
 The Day the Clown Cried (1972 unedited/unreleased) - Ludwig
 Around the World with Fanny Hill (1974) - Peter Wild
 The Great Waldo Pepper (1975) - Ernst Kessler
 Russian Roulette (1975) - Vostik
 Hawaii Five-O (1977) "East Wind, Ill Wind" - Hoffman/Zadak
 Bomsalva (1978) - Sven Gunnar Alm
 Shoot the Sun Down (1978) - Captain
 Wonder Woman (1976) "Fausta, The Nazi Wonder Woman" - Colonel Kesselman and "Going, Going, Gone" (1979) - Vladimir Zukov
 Meteor (1979) - Rolf Manheim
 Raise the Titanic (1980) - Captain Prevlov
 The A Team (1986) - Dr. Werner Strasser 
 I Saw What You Did (1988) - Larsson
 Late for Dinner (1991) - Dr. Dan Chilblains
 Zorn (1994) - President Taft
 Back to Even (1998) - Bernie
 Jordgubbar med riktig mjölk (2001) - Sigge

References

External links

1937 births
2022 deaths
20th-century Swedish male actors
People from Uppsala
Swedish male film actors